The Short N.3 Cromarty was a prototype British twin-engined biplane flying boat, designed towards the end of the First World War. Only a single example was built, which first flew in 1921 and was wrecked in 1922.

Development
In April 1917, the British Admiralty developed a requirement for a long-range patrol flying boat to work in support of the Fleet, and issued Specification N.3(b) (later reissued as Air Ministry Specification XXX) to meet this need.  This resulted in designs from Vickers (for the Valentia) and Shorts of Rochester, who, although better known at the time for floatplanes, had gained experience in flying boats, building Felixstowe F.3 and F.5s under licence from April 1917.

Short Brothers received an order for three prototypes just after the Armistice ended the First World War.  Short's design, the N.3 Cromarty, was a large, twin-engine biplane. It was powered by two  Rolls-Royce Condor engines, and had a similar, but larger hull to that of the Felixstowe flying boats, with a biplane tail. It featured a side-by-side cockpit for the two pilots, a large box cockpit for a gunner, who was armed with a COW automatic cannon, and a dorsal position for another gunner armed with a Lewis gun.

Production of the prototypes started in February 1919, but the second and third were cancelled before completion, with the first prototype eventually being launched on 21 March 1921, being first flown by John Lankester Parker on 11 April 1921.

Operational history
After extensive testing, the Cromarty was handed over to the RAF's Seaplane Development Flight on 17 June 1922. In August, the Flight, comprising the Cromarty, two Felixstowe F.5s and a Phoenix Cork, set out on trials of operating large flying boats away from support facilities for extended periods of time. Arriving at St Mary's, Isles of Scilly on 21 August, the Cromarty successfully weathered a storm, but was taxied onto a reef, holing the hull. The damage was declared uneconomic to repair and the Cromarty was scrapped in place.

Tests with a metal-hulled Felixstowe F.5 resulted in an order for a prototype of an improved, metal-hulled flying boat, based on the Cromarty. This became the prototype Short Singapore I.

Specifications

See also

Notes

References

"Aircraft Production at a Glance". Flight, 14 December 1922, pp. 725–740.
Barnes, C.H. Shorts Aircraft since 1900. London:Putnam, 1967.
London, Peter. British Flying Boats. Stroud, UK:Sutton Publishing, 2003. .
Short, Oswald "All-Metal Flying Boat Hulls". Flight, 17 December 1925. pp. 823–825.
Williams, Anthony G. and Gustin, Emmanuel. Flying Guns: World War I and its Aftermath 1914–32. Ramsbury, UK:Airlife, 2003. .

External links

Photo

1920s British patrol aircraft
Flying boats
Cromarty
Biplanes
Aircraft first flown in 1921
Twin piston-engined tractor aircraft